George Thomas Tanselle (born January 29, 1934) is an American textual critic, bibliographer, and book collector, especially known for his work on Herman Melville. He was Vice President of the John Simon Guggenheim Foundation from 1978 to 2006.

Biography 
George Thomas Tanselle was born on January 29, 1934, in Lebanon, Indiana. He received a bachelor's degree from Yale University in 1955. Tanselle attended graduate school at Northwestern University where he studied with Harrison Hayford among others. He received his PhD in 1959 from the department of English where his dissertation was titled Faun at the Barricades: The Life and Work of Floyd Dell. From 1960 through 1978 he taught at the University of Wisconsin. After moving to New York City in 1978, he served as vice president of the John Simon Guggenheim Memorial Foundation until 2006.  He was an adjunct professor of English at Columbia University, and co-editor of the Northwestern-Newberry Edition of the writings of Herman Melville. He was president of the Bibliographical Society of the University of Virginia 1993–2006. He is also a member of the board of directors and textual consultant of the Library of America.  He was president of the Grolier Club, the pre-eminent American society of bibliophiles, 1986–1990.

Tanselle held fellowships from the John Simon Guggenheim Memorial Foundation (1969–70), American Council of Learned Societies (1973–74), and the National Endowment for the Humanities (1977–78).

Theories of textual editing and influence
Tanselle absorbed the principles of Walter W. Greg and Fredson Bowers, who developed the theory of textual criticism, a branch of textual scholarship, philology, and literary criticism that is concerned with the identification and removal of transcription errors in texts, both manuscripts and printed books, in order to create a text which most closely reflects the author's intent. He has been called the "most prominent, consistent, and authoritative defender of the Greg-Bowers approach to editing," which is now the "dominant theoretical and practical position in Anglo-American editing." Tanselle has sought to accommodate legitimate critiques of its limitations, such as the insistence on the difference between substantive and accidentals, that is, the difference between the words and their spelling and punctuation.  Tanselle, says one scholar, like Greg and Bowers,  postulates the notion of an "ideal 'correct' text, measured against which extant texts show various degrees of 'corruption' that the editor seeks to remove." Tanselle follows this tradition more flexibly, but still comes to rest on the "principle of the author's final intention," which the "editor (or critic) seeks first to understand and then to implement..." This position is opposed to the New Criticism, which rejects the author's intent, since the author's intentions are not relevant specifically by themselves, taken solely, for an artistic work, or "piece of art", once it is finished.

He then applied these principles to the study of American literature.  He was particularly active as textual editor for the Northwestern-Newberry edition of the works of Herman Melville to make a critical edition, as approved by The Center for Scholarly Editions.

Major publications

Books
 
 
 
 
 
 
 
 
 
 
 
 
 
 
 
 
 
 
 
 
 
Selected articles

References and further reading
 
Bryant, John. “Editing Versions: Historicism, Biography, and the Digital in Tanselle’s Descriptive Bibliography.” Textual Cultures : Text, Contexts, Interpretation 14, no. 2 (2022).

Notes

External links 
 Tanselle's syllabi to Introduction to Bibliography and Introduction to Scholarly Editing seminars taught at Rare Book School
G. Thomas Tanselle papers (his personal archive) in the Manuscripts and Archives Division of the New York Public Library

American bibliographers
Textual criticism
Textual scholarship
1934 births
Living people
People from Lebanon, Indiana
Herman Melville
Presidents of the Bibliographical Society of America